Rhenium(IV) oxide or rhenium dioxide is the inorganic compound with the formula ReO2. This gray to black crystalline solid is a laboratory reagent that can be used as a catalyst. It adopts the rutile structure.

Synthesis and reactions
It forms via comproportionation:
2 Re2O7  +  3 Re    →   7 ReO2
Single crystals are obtained by chemical transport, using iodine as the transporting agent.:
 ReO2  +  I2  ReO2I2

At high temperatures it undergoes disproportionation:
7ReO2   →   2Re2O7  +  3Re

It forms perrhenates with alkaline hydrogen peroxide and oxidizing acids. In molten sodium hydroxide it forms sodium rhenate:

 2NaOH  +  ReO2   →   Na2ReO3  +  H2O

References

Rhenium compounds
Transition metal oxides